During the 1971–72 season Hibernian, a football club based in Edinburgh, came third out of 18 clubs in the Scottish First Division and reached the final of the Scottish Cup ending up losing 6–1 to Celtic.

Scottish First Division

Final League table

Scottish League Cup

Group stage

Group 1 final table

Knockout stage

Scottish Cup

See also
List of Hibernian F.C. seasons

References

External links
Hibernian 1971/1972 results and fixtures, Soccerbase

Hibernian F.C. seasons
Hibernian